The Guild of Railway Artists (GRA) is a British-based art guild whose members are painters of railway subjects.

Membership can be applied for by submitting examples of one's work.  "Friends" of the Guild are supporters of the guild who are not necessarily accomplished railway artists themselves.  The Patrons of the Guild are Sir William McAlpine, 6th Baronet and Pete Waterman.

The Guild has approximately 150 members and exhibitions are held annually.

Fellowship
Fellowship is conferred by the governing council.  There have only been five fellows (who are entitled to use the post-nominals FGRA)

 John Austin
 Terence Cuneo (died 1996)
 Philip D. Hawkins (elected 1998)
 Malcolm Root
 David Shepherd

References

External links 
 

British artist groups and collectives
Guilds in the United Kingdom
Trains in art